Boom Boom is a 1936 Looney Tunes animated cartoon directed by Jack King. The cartoon stars Beans the Cat and Porky Pig.

Plot
The short begins with a bunch of explosions, with bombs, bullets, rockets, and fireworks; and many people immediately rushed into war. One worker who appears climbing up the steps from a nearby shelter, he starts giving attention by blowing his trumpet until a nearby rocket exploded on him. His clothes are wrinkled, the part of the area went into deep-land, and his trumpet went out of shape with many curves. He later flattens itself up as he slowly faints and dies. On the next scene, another person (who appears to be a dog) shoots a machine gun in front on top of the abandoned brick house's chimney. 2 members later worked together to shoot a cannon in front of the chimney. One out of the two workers then comes out of the cannon's hole and knocks the dog out with his mallet. The dog then starts to feel dazed as he lays down of the chimney as he started to faint. A cow (who appears to look like Clarabelle) then starts to run before getting attacked. One bullet, or rocket, managed to rip her suit up; and another rips his hat. Her hands are later trapped by the hole of her hat. She managed to go inside of some shelter. She then closes the door by using his right foot. An incoming bullet then later went through the cow's legs, smashing the bottom of the door. The bullet then smashes the top of the door and destroys most of the right side of the wall. Another bullet went through but the bullet didn't decide to destroy something. Instead the bullet saws the broken hat that came from the cow. He rushes as he recognized some rockets and grabbing some piano keys. She then plays with the cannons by playing the first phrase of the familiar tune "Yankee Doodle" until another bullet destroys the house; killing her. It displays the sky with the cow (who apparently goes straight to heaven with wings, and having a different color scheme) plays the last parts of "Yankee Doodle" with her harp. Another dog person came along with very big teeth, aiming his gun until he hits the trigger. A cork that attaches to the string of the gun hits him in the top of his nose, and nearly into his eyes. Another dog person then shoots with a machine gun as he starts to shake as he walks into the next position. The same dog person with the very big teeth then does the same thing but by covering his head with his hat. He tries to look but got hit by the cork in the same position. Another dog appears as he literally pulled the tag off of one of the hand-grenades. He immediately tries to throw the grenade, but immediately throws the cork instead. The dog then gets sent way up high in the air after the explosion. The ambulance later was driven down the street until the driver recognized the person. He speeds up, landing the person into his net, and dumps him straight to the back of his ambulance.

Porky and Beans
Like the other characters, Beans and Porky are soldiers and have been sent into the battlefield. Porky is on a surge with some fellow infantry. Porky first starts to blow his whistle to start the journey, bombs started to rain in the close's sight. When bombs rain near them, the pig starts to crawl, but notices that there is nobody there to protect the pig. Instead, he quickly retreats and runs into the ditch, dazing him. He later then goes down inside a bunker and under a bed is where Beans is sleeping on. Porky then tries to wake Beans up by taking cover underneath his bed. Beans gets up and tries to encourage Porky not to be afraid. He wishes that he will stay on the farm, until the cow recognized a joke. An explosion was heard. He then takes cover under the table. 4 other characters including a duck (who quacks instead of speaks), then sings "We're in the army now".

While Beans and Porky are having a meal, a dove comes to them with a note, who literally got shot by a gunshot. He then literally dives down to where Beans and Porky are spotted. The bird walked slowly to the 2, receiving the message. Beans and Porky then saw the bird lying down, dead. Beans then reads the note. The note was a message from their general who is held hostage by enemy forces. They then set off by running near the closest vehicle by taking a couple of turns into the dispatch's headquarters (which is destroyed by a bomb), and both Beans and Porky took off from a used motorcycle to rescue their leader. Beans took off first, but Porky didn't recognized that happened quick, but Beans went around in the circle as he picks Porky up violently by almost running over by him, sending him to fly and landing into the passenger side of the motorcycle.

Beans and Porky both then goes into enemy territory. Continuing the journey inside the motorcycle, the bullet bill (not from Super Mario Brothers) then spotted Porky and Beans riding in a motorcycle. He rushes with a mechanical siren in the distance. Beans then spotted the bullet as another mechanical siren (with a sounding of a miniature Federal Signal Model 28H) then forces the motorcycle to rush faster. They literally go around tracks and scenics until the motorcycle, running over by a tree; splitting the 2 cars in half. The cars then later flew Beans and Porky to the ground after running over by electric wires (who appeared to be not working at the time). The bullet came by and literally missing the 2. Beans and Porky both hid in nearby mines. He continues the journey by moving the hole to different various areas, with missing 2 more explosions by bullets. Looking from outside undetected, they find their general in an enemy bunker, being interrogated and tortured by 2 other soldiers; 1 appears to torture the general by lighting up a cigarette box by his bare-foot. Beans makes his move by tying up the enemy officers from a distance with a rope and a rocket attached to it. The rocket then was set off by Beans, and the 2 soldiers were completely trapped. Beans and Porky knocked down the 2 other soldiers with their hands to the floor, then rush forward and pick up the general. The general and the two soldiers attempt to escape using a nearby airplane. But before they can fly far enough, the sky is filled with bullets, and their aircraft was shot by one of the enemy's fire, forcing the plane to slice in half, and falls down in sight to the ground, causing them to plunge back to the earth.

Fortunately, all three of them survived the crash and are in a bed at a hospital. Though injured, the general is honored by the soldiers' bravery as he awards medals to Beans and Porky. But fortunately, the metal was originally given by Beans, who literally split the metals into 2 by given one to himself and the other to Porky. All 3 laughed about what Beans did as the cartoon ends.

References

External links
 
 

1936 films
1936 animated films
1930s American animated films
1930s war films
American black-and-white films
American war films
American buddy films
Films scored by Norman Spencer (composer)
Films directed by Jack King
Beans the Cat films
Porky Pig films
Looney Tunes shorts
Warner Bros. Cartoons animated short films
Animated films about cats
Films about pigs